Black Hearts in Battersea is a children's novel by Joan Aiken first published in 1964.  The second book in the Wolves Chronicles, it is loosely a sequel to her earlier Wolves of Willoughby Chase. The book is set in a slightly altered historical England—during the reign of King James III—in the early 19th century, and follows the adventures of Simon, an orphan whose plans to study painting in London are derailed by high adventure. Aiken was inspired to create an atmosphere of important events having already transpired offstage (which was helped by the fact that a great deal of the beginning had to be left out due to length), and also included an involved "Dickensian plot" which she believed to complement the habit many children have of rereading or having a book reread to them.

TV adaptation
In 1995, the book was adapted by James Andrew Hall into a television series by James Andrew Hall, airing on BBC1 from 31 December 1995 to 11 February 1996.

Cast list
 Mark Burdis as Scrimshaw
 Jade Williams as Dido
 Roger Bizley as Captain Dark
 Annette Badland as Dolly Buckle
 John Altman as Midwink
 Gemma Sealey as Sophie
 William Mannering as Simon
 Richard Woods as Boy with Wheelbarrow
*Choponopopy Chanvleguis as Chuncky

Radio adaptation

A BBC Radio dramatisation by Lin Coghlan, directed by Marc Beeby, of Joan Aiken's classic children's adventure. Starring Joe Dempsie as Simon, Nicola Miles-Wilden as Dido, and Emerald O'Hanrahan as Sophie.

Part One:
Young Simon comes to 18th century London to study painting - and finds himself caught up in wicked Hanoverian plots to overthrow the King.

Broadcasts: BBC Radio 4, 14:15 Wed 23 Dec.2009. 14:15 Wed 21 Dec.2011.

Part Two:
To save the King from Hanoverian plotters Simon and Sophie must first suffer shipwreck, attacks by wolves and a narrow escape from an exploding castle, in a hot air balloon.

Broadcasts: BBC Radio 4, 14:15, Thu 24 Dec.2009.  14:15, Thu 22 Dec.2011.

Cast list

SIMON ..... Joe Dempsie
DIDO ..... Nicola Miles-Wildin
SOPHIE ..... Emerald O'Hanrahan
DUKE ..... John Rowe
DUCHESS ..... Sheila Reid
COBBE ..... Ben Crowe
MRS COBBE ..... Annabelle Dowler
MR TWITE ..... Rhys Jennings
MRS TWITE ..... Tessa Nicholson
JUSTIN ..... Sam Pamphilon
BUCKLE ..... Nigel Hastings
MRS BUCKLE ..... Kate Layden
DR FURNEAUX ..... Bruce Alexander
DR FIELD ..... Ewan Hooper
MOGG ..... John Biggins
GUS ..... Joseph Cohen Cole
JABWING ..... Piers Wehner
WOMAN ..... Kate Layden

References

External links 

1964 British novels
1964 children's books
British children's novels
English novels
Novels by Joan Aiken
British alternative history novels
Children's historical novels
Novels set in the 19th century
Novels about orphans
Doubleday (publisher) books
Jonathan Cape books
British novels adapted into television shows
Novels adapted into radio programs